Anton van Zyl (born 23 February 1980) is a South African rugby union footballer. His regular playing position is Lock.

External links 
WP rugby profile
Stormers profile

1980 births
Living people
South African rugby union players
Stormers players
Western Province (rugby union) players
Rugby union locks
Afrikaner people
South African people of Dutch descent
Golden Lions players
Lions (United Rugby Championship) players
Rugby union players from Cape Town